The men's junior pairs is one of the events at the annual English National Bowls Championships.

Past winners

References

Bowls in England